The Grammy Award for Best Gospel Song is an honor presented at the Grammy Awards, a ceremony that was established in 1958 and originally called the Gramophone Awards, to recording artists for quality songs in the gospel music genre. Honors in several categories are presented at the ceremony annually by the National Academy of Recording Arts and Sciences of the United States to "honor artistic achievement, technical proficiency and overall excellence in the recording industry, without regard to album sales or chart position".

The award, reserved for songwriters, was first presented to James Harris III, Terry Lewis, James Q. Wright, and Yolanda Adams at the 48th Grammy Awards in 2006, for the song "Be Blessed" performed by Yolanda Adams. According to the category description guide for the 52nd Grammy Awards, the song "must contain melody and lyrics and must be either a new song or a song first achieving prominence during the eligibility year. Songs containing prominent samples or interpolations are not eligible."

From 2012, the category was split into the Best Gospel Song and Best Contemporary Christian Music Song categories; the latter was a newly formed category as part of a major overhaul of Grammy categories, to make a clear distinction between traditional, old-style gospel songs and contemporary gospel songs.

Further changes in the Gospel/Contemporary Christian Music genre field will lead to a merger between this category and the Best Gospel/Contemporary Christian Music Performance in 2015 into the new Best Gospel Performance/Song category, which will recognize Gospel performances and songwriting. According to the Grammy committee, "changes to the field were made in the interest of clarifying the criteria, representing the current culture and creative DNA of the gospel and Contemporary Christian Music communities, and better reflecting the diversity and authenticity of today's gospel music industry".

Recipients

 Each year is linked to the article about the Grammy Awards held that year.
 The performing artist is listed but, unless they wrote or co-wrote the song, does not receive the award.
 Showing the name of the songwriter(s), the nominated song and in parentheses the performer's name(s).

See also 
Grammy Award for Best Gospel/Contemporary Christian Music Performance
Grammy Award for Best Contemporary Christian Music Performance/Song
Grammy Award for Best Contemporary Christian Music Song
Grammy Award for Song of the Year

References

External links
Official site of the Grammy Awards

Gospel Song
Gospel Song
Song awards
Songwriting awards